Mute Massaker is an album by Caspar Brötzmann, released in June 1999 through Our Choice.

Track listing

Accolades

Personnel 
Musicians
Caspar Brötzmann – guitar, illustrations
Robert Dämmig – drums
Ottmar Seum – bass guitar
Production and additional personnel
Bruno Gebhard – engineering, mixing

References

External links 
 

1999 albums
Caspar Brötzmann albums